Henry A. Gunderson (June 20, 1878 – October 7, 1940) was a Wisconsin attorney who served as the 27th Lieutenant Governor of Wisconsin.

Henry A. Gunderson was born in Columbia County, Wisconsin in 1878, the son of Norwegian immigrants. He graduated from the University of Wisconsin in 1900 and in 1903  received a law degree from Columbia University.

He returned to Wisconsin the next year, where he practiced law in Portage. He served several terms as the district attorney for Columbia County. In 1936, he became Lieutenant Governor of Wisconsin, but resigned on October 16, 1937 to accept an appointment to the state tax commission. After Governor Philip La Follette left office in 1939, the commission was disbanded, and Gunderson returned to his law practice. He died of a heart attack on October 7, 1940 in Portage, Wisconsin.

References

1878 births
1940 deaths
People from Portage, Wisconsin
Lieutenant Governors of Wisconsin
Wisconsin Progressives (1924)
20th-century American politicians
Wisconsin lawyers
American people of Norwegian descent
University of Wisconsin–Madison alumni
Columbia Law School alumni
American Lutherans